Yevgraf Yevgrafovich Fyodorov (in Saint Petersburg – 19 July 1965 in Moscow), was a climatologist. He was a son of Russian mathematician Yevgraf Fyodorov.

Graduation from the University of Saint Petersburg 1910. Researcher in the Magneto-Meteorological Observatory, Pavlovsk 1911-1934, professor of geography with the USSR Academy of Sciences 1934-1951. Corresponding Member of the USSR Academy of Sciences from 1946.

Fyodorov's main contribution consisted in detailed development in descriptive climatology, with a method to describe local climates in terms of daily weather observations.

Bibliography
 Climate as an aggregate of weather. Journal of Meteorology, #7 (1925).
 Distribution and type of precipitation in the plains of the European part of the USSR in the summer. Works of the USSR Academy of Sciences Institute of Geography, #28 (1938).
 with A. I. Baranov: Climate and Weather of the European Part of the USSR. (1949).

Biography
Ya. I. Feldman: Yevgraf Yevgrafovich Fedorov. Izvest. Akad. Nauk S.S.S.R., Ser. Geogr., #1 (1956).

References

Climatologists from the Soviet Union
Corresponding Members of the USSR Academy of Sciences
1880 births
1965 deaths
Scientists from Saint Petersburg
Saint Petersburg State University alumni